Jelks Preserve is a  natural preserve with  of trail along the Myakka River in southern Sarasota County, Florida.

History
The land was purchased in 1999 via the one percent county sales tax and a donation from the Jelks Family Foundation (namesake for the preserve). The habitat is riverine floodplain and includes live oak with epiphytes as well as Carolina jessamine and coralbean wildflowers. Wildlife include gopher tortoises, swallowtail butterflies, swallow-tailed kites, and song birds.

References

Nature reserves in Florida
Protected areas of Sarasota County, Florida